This article lists political parties in Curaçao. Curaçao has a multi-party system with a great number of political parties, in which usually a single party does not have a chance of gaining power alone, and thus parties must work with each other to form coalition governments.

Parties

Parties represented in Parliament

Extraparliamentary and defunct parties

See also 
 List of political parties by country

References

Curacao
 
+Curacao
Curacao
Curaçao-related lists
Lists of organisations based in Curaçao